Sir John Carling,  (January 23, 1828 – November 6, 1911) was a Canadian politician and prominent businessman who was associated with the Carling Brewery in London, Ontario. The Carling family and its descendants later resided in Ottawa, Montreal, Halifax, Brockville, London, Toronto and Windsor in Canada, as well as Guernsey in the Channel Islands.

Life and career
John Carling was the son of farmer Thomas Carling, who emigrated from Etton in Yorkshire, England. Arriving to Upper Canada in 1818, the family moved to London in 1839, where Thomas founded the Carling Brewery in 1843 using a recipe from his native Yorkshire. In 1849, the brewery was turned over to John and his brother William.

His political career began in municipal government, then in 1858, he was elected to the Legislative Assembly of the Province of Canada. After Confederation in 1867, Carling represented London in both provincial and federal legislatures until such practice was made illegal in 1872. In the 1871 provincial election, he defeated former London mayor Francis Evans Cornish.

From 1878 to 1891, he served in the House of Commons as a Conservative Member of Parliament (MP), holding the position of 7th Postmaster General from 1882 to 1885, and Minister of Agriculture from 1885 to 1891. In this position, he established the Ontario Agricultural College and the Central Experimental Farm near Ottawa. In 1888, he simultaneously held the position of Postmaster General for a second time, briefly.

After losing the 1891 election to Charles S. Hyman, he was appointed to the Senate by Prime Minister John A. Macdonald. However, the election was disputed and declared void, thus Carling resigned from the Senate in order to run in a by-election in 1892, which he won. He served in the House of Commons until just before the 1896 election, when he resigned and was re-appointed to the Senate.

Meanwhile, Carling remained active in London affairs, using his position in the federal government to influence politics and business. In 1875, Carling and his brother William built a new Carling Brewery, and an even larger one was built after the first burned down in 1879. The brewery was one of the largest in Canada, and it rivaled the production of fellow London brewery Labatt.

Carling also ensured that the Great Western Railway, the London and Port Stanley Railway, and the London, Huron and Bruce Railway passed through London. Due to his influence, the Grand Trunk Railway began to manufacture their cars in London.

In 1878, he established a water commission to provide a water supply to the city. Carling also established the Ontario Hospital for the Insane in London. In 1885, he provided the land on which Wolseley Barracks was established, now the Home Station of The Royal Canadian Regiment and the garrison of the regiment's 4th Battalion. He also facilitated the establishment of Victoria Park.

Carling was knighted in 1893 and served in the Senate until his death in 1911.

Legacy
In 1927, the Carling Brewery sponsored a trans-Atlantic flight from London (Canada) to London (UK). The plane was named the Sir John Carling, but both it and its pilots, Terence Tully and James Medcalf, disappeared over the Atlantic Ocean.

Today, there is an arena in London named for him. The town of Port Carling, Ontario, is named in his honour, as are the agricultural buildings in Ottawa. Carling Avenue in Ottawa is named for him as well, as are the neighbourhoods of Carlington and Carlingwood.

Archives 
There is a John Carling fonds at Library and Archives Canada.

References

External links

Thomas Carling commemorative plaque – recorded on openplaques.org

1828 births
1911 deaths
Businesspeople from London, Ontario
Canadian people of English descent
Canadian Methodists
Conservative Party of Canada (1867–1942) MPs
Conservative Party of Canada (1867–1942) senators
Canadian senators from Ontario
Canadian Knights Commander of the Order of St Michael and St George
London, Ontario city councillors
Members of the House of Commons of Canada from Ontario
Members of the Legislative Assembly of the Province of Canada from Canada West
Members of the King's Privy Council for Canada
Persons of National Historic Significance (Canada)
Pre-Confederation Canadian businesspeople
Progressive Conservative Party of Ontario MPPs
Postmasters General of Canada